Ewen MacRury (1891–1986) was a Free Church of Scotland minister who served as Moderator of the General Assembly in 1944.

Life

He was born in 1891 one of eight children to John Little (Ewan Beag) MacRury (b.1843) and his wife, Betsy MacDonald, crofters from North Uist.

He graduated MA from Glasgow University in 1915.

He first appears as minister of the Free Church in Shiskine.

He was minister of Glen Urquhart from at least 1931.

He was a member of the Gaelic Society alongside Provost Alexander MacEwen.

In May 1944 he was elected Moderator of the General Assembly of the Free Church of Scotland. He was succeeded in 1945 by Roderick A. Finlayson.

Family

He was married to Christina (Kirsty).

Publications

A Hebridean Parish (1950)

References

1891 births
1986 deaths
Alumni of the University of Glasgow
20th-century Ministers of the Free Church of Scotland